Guanabenz (pronounced GWAHN-a-benz, sold under the trade name Wytensin) is an alpha agonist that is selective to the alpha-2 adrenergic receptor. Guanabenz is used as an antihypertensive drug, i.e. to treat high blood pressure (hypertension).

The most common side effects during guanabenz therapy are dizziness, drowsiness, dry mouth, headache and weakness.

Guanabenz can make one drowsy or less alert, therefore driving or operating dangerous machinery is not recommended.

See also
 Guanoxabenz
 Guanfacine

References

Alpha-2 adrenergic receptor agonists
Chloroarenes
Guanidines